In linguistics, the postelative case (abbreviated ) is a noun case that indicates location from behind.

This case is found in the Northeast Caucasian language Lezgian.

References

Grammatical cases